Croí Ró-Naofa GAA is a Gaelic Athletic Association club in based in the Tallaght,  South Dublin.

The club has an adult men's football team which in 2016 played in the Dublin AFL Division 10 and the Dublin Junior "E" Football Championship.

History
The club was formed in 2000 and serves the Killinarden-Jobstown area of Tallaght.

As of 2022, the club fields teams for both boys and girls at U11, U16, and Adult age groups.

In October 2019, the club was left without its home pitch in Killinarden Park for over a year after a car had been driven around the pitch overnight and burnt out on the grounds, destroying the pitch for the 18th time that year.

Honours
 Dublin Junior E Football Championship Winners 2013
 Dublin Adult Ladies Junior B Championship Winners 2019
 Dublin Adult Ladies Div 4 League Winners 2019

References

Gaelic games clubs in South Dublin (county)
Gaelic football clubs in South Dublin (county)